Peter Reilly (26 November 1933 – 15 March 1977) was a Progressive Conservative party member of the House of Commons of Canada. He was a broadcaster and journalist by career.

Career 
He was elected at the Ottawa West riding in the 1972 general election and served his term in the 29th Canadian Parliament before being defeated in the 1974 election by Lloyd Francis of the Liberal party.

During his term as Member of Parliament, Reilly was in conflict with former Prime Minister and fellow party member John Diefenbaker whom he charged was undermining the leadership of Progressive Conservative leader Robert Stanfield. This feud began in early 1973 when Stanfield, Reilly and other house members supported a federal bilingualism initiative, which Diefenbaker and several other members opposed.

Following his departure from Parliament, Reilly returned to broadcasting with CBC Television as one of the founding reporters of the fifth estate. One of his reports was broadcast on the program 15 March 1977, the same day that he died at his Toronto residence from an apparent case of heart failure.

References

External links
 
 Peter Reilly at CBC / The Fifth Estate

1933 births
1977 deaths
Canadian television journalists
Journalists from Toronto
Members of the House of Commons of Canada from Ontario
Politicians from Ottawa
Politicians from Toronto
Progressive Conservative Party of Canada MPs